Leung Chen Nam (born 17 August 1984) is a former professional darts player from Hong Kong.

Career

Leung Chun Nam qualified for the 2013 PDC World Championship after coming through the Greater China qualifier.

He caused an upset by defeating experienced German darts player Andree Welge 4–1 in the preliminary round, before being beaten 0–3 in sets in the first round by England's Kevin Painter.

World Championship results

PDC

 2013: First round (lost to Kevin Painter 0–3)

References

External links

Living people
Hong Kong darts players
1984 births
Professional Darts Corporation associate players